José Manuel Cruz Orozco (born 10 August 1988) is a Spanish footballer who plays as a defender for Segunda División RFEF club Córdoba CF.

Club career
Born in Córdoba, Andalusia, Cruz finished his formation with Real Madrid, then played his first three years as a senior with the C-team. On 15 July 2010 he signed with Sporting de Gijón, but only appeared officially for the reserves in Segunda División B.

In the 2012 summer, Cruz joined fellow league club Lucena CF. After only one season he penned a one-year deal with Real Jaén, freshly promoted to Segunda División.

On 18 August 2013, Cruz played his first game as a professional, starting in a 1–2 home loss against SD Eibar. He scored his first professional goal on 30 March of the following year, netting the last in a 1–1 home draw against Hércules CF.

On 27 July 2015, Cruz moved abroad for the first time in his career, joining Hong Kong club Yuen Long FC. The following January he returned to his native country, and represented UD Almería B and Racing de Ferrol in the following years.

On 28 July 2017, Cruz signed for Norwegian Eliteserien club Viking FK. He left the club after the 2017 season.

On 17 January 2018, Cruz returned to Spain, signing for Segunda División B club Mérida AD. Ahead of the 2018–19 season, he joined fellow Segunda División B club Marbella FC. After two seasons with Marbella, he signed for Linares Deportivo in September 2020.

Club statistics

References

External links

1988 births
Living people
Footballers from Córdoba, Spain
Spanish footballers
Association football defenders
Segunda División players
Segunda División B players
Tercera División players
Real Madrid C footballers
Sporting de Gijón B players
Lucena CF players
Real Jaén footballers
UD Almería B players
Racing de Ferrol footballers
Mérida AD players
Marbella FC players
Linares Deportivo footballers
Hong Kong Premier League players
Yuen Long FC players
Eliteserien players
Viking FK players
Spanish expatriate footballers
Spanish expatriate sportspeople in Hong Kong
Spanish expatriate sportspeople in Norway
Expatriate footballers in Hong Kong
Expatriate footballers in Norway